The Catholic University of Applied Sciences Mainz (German Katholische Hochschule Mainz) is a university located in Mainz, Germany. It was founded in 1972 and is operating on behalf of the Roman Catholic Dioceses Cologne, Limburg, Mainz, Speyer and Trier.

Notable people
 Edith Kellnhauser (1933–2019), nursing scientist, educator, and writer

See also
 Fachhochschule
 List of colleges and universities
 Mainz

External links
Catholic University of Applied Sciences Mainz 

Universities and colleges in Rhineland-Palatinate
Mainz
Universities of Applied Sciences in Germany